Alyssa-Jane Cook (born 16 February 1967) is an Australian actress, singer and TV presenter currently on TVSN.

Actress roles 
She is best known for her regular role as Lisa Bennett on the Australian television soap opera E Street.  She played the lead role of Olivia Murray in the series Above the Law, and appeared as Kelli Edwards in  Home and Away.

As a presenter, she hosted the series "Sex/Life", co-hosted Australia’s Funniest People, and was a regular on Home Life Style, Beauty and the Beast, and Good News Week.

In the science fiction series Farscape she appeared as the character Gilina Renaez in the episodes "PK Tech Girl", "Nerve", "The Hidden Memory", and "John Quixote".

On stage, Cook played Columbia in "The New Rocky Horror Show" 1992  Australian tour, and has appeared in The Vagina Monologues.
 
In 2008, Cook was the face of weight-loss company Bodytrim.  She appeared in advertisements on Australian TV for their products. Cook was also the face of the Christmas shopping company Castle Hampers and featured in their TV ads as well.

Cook is now a presenter on Australian shopping network, TVSN.

Personal life 
Alyssa-Jane Cook lives in Sydney with her husband Gary Davis and their three children, including Georgia-May, who was the oldest cast member of the 2012 production of Young Talent Time on Channel Ten and stars in Dive Club.

Filmography

Film

Television

References

Further reading

External links
 

1967 births
Living people
Australian television actresses
Actresses from Sydney
Australian television presenters
Australian women television presenters